Bagnara may refer to:

 Bagnara Calabra, comune in the Province of Reggio Calabria in Calabria, southern Italy
 Bagnara di Romagna, comune in the Province of Ravenna in Emilia-Romagna, Italy